Richard Hall (born 25 October 1971) Jamaican former professional boxer who competed from 1993 to 2013. He held the interim WBA light heavyweight title, and challenged for world titles three times.

Career
Hall won the interim World Boxing Association light heavyweight title against Anthony Bigeni and lost other world title bids against Roy Jones Jr. and Dariusz Michalczewski (twice).

Hall has also fought Byron Mitchell, Denton Daley and O'Neil Bell.

Professional boxing record

References

External links

|-

Living people
Sportspeople from Kingston, Jamaica
Jamaican male boxers
Cruiserweight boxers
Light-heavyweight boxers
1971 births